Debendra Mallik is an electrical engineer at Intel Corporation in Chandler, Arizona. He was named a Fellow of the Institute of Electrical and Electronics Engineers (IEEE) in 2015 for his contributions to microprocessor packaging.

References

Fellow Members of the IEEE
Living people
Year of birth missing (living people)
Place of birth missing (living people)
Intel people
American electrical engineers